Hakimabad may refer to:

Hakimabad, Golestan
Hakimabad, Markazi
Hakimabad, Qazvin
Hakimabad, Chenaran, Razavi Khorasan Province
Hakimabad, Golbajar, Chenaran County, Razavi Khorasan Province
Hakimabad, Fariman, Razavi Khorasan Province
Hakimabad, Nishapur, Razavi Khorasan Province
Hakimabad, Khash, Sistan and Baluchestan Province
Hakimabad, Tehran
Hakimabad, Bafq, Yazd Province
Hakimabad, Taft, Yazd Province
Hakimabad Rural District, in Markazi Province